Alexei Pepelyayev (born 16 June 1984) is a Russian professional ice hockey defenceman. He is currently playing with Humo Tashkent of the Supreme Hockey League (VHL).

Pepelyayev made his Kontinental Hockey League debut playing with Khanty-Mansiysk Yugra during the 2010–11 KHL season.

References

External links

1984 births
Living people
Buran Voronezh players
HC Dynamo Moscow players
HC Lada Togliatti players
Metallurg Novokuznetsk players
Russian ice hockey defencemen
HC Sochi players
HC Spartak Moscow players
Torpedo Nizhny Novgorod players
HC Yugra players
Sportspeople from Barnaul